Lester Rollo Stoefen (March 30, 1911 – February 8, 1970) was an American tennis player of the 1930s.

Career
Stoefen, partnering with compatriot George Lott, won three Grand Slam doubles titles: 1934 Wimbledon Championships, 1933 and 1934 U.S. National Championships. In 1933 he was ranked world No. 9 by Pierre Gillou (president of the Fédération Française de Tennis) and World No. 10 by A. Wallis Myers of The Daily Telegraph. Stoefen reached the semifinals of the U. S. Championships singles in 1933, losing to Fred Perry in straight sets.

In 1934 he played for the US Davis Cup team and won all his six matches, including the only match the US won in their defeat in the final against Great Britain. Also in 1934 Stoefen won the U.S. Indoor Tennis Championships singles event, defeating Gregory Mangin in the final in three straight sets.

Stoefen signed a professional contract in November 1934 with promoter Bill O'Brien. In January 1935, at Madison Square Garden, he started a series of head-to-head matches against Ellsworth Vines and by March trailed him 1–25.

Personal life
He was the older brother of basketball player Art Stoefen, and both attended Los Angeles High School.

On February 6, 1936, he married actress Ruth Moody in Hollywood.

He died on La Jolla, California on February 8, 1970, of liver cirrhosis.

Grand Slam finals

Doubles (3 titles)

Mixed doubles (1 runner-up)

References

External links
 
 
 

1911 births
1970 deaths
American male tennis players
Sportspeople from Des Moines, Iowa
Tennis people from Iowa
United States National champions (tennis)
Wimbledon champions (pre-Open Era)
Grand Slam (tennis) champions in men's doubles
Professional tennis players before the Open Era